Chicken Heart(s) may refer to:

 Chicken Heart, a 2002 Japanese film with Hiroyuki Ikeuchi
 "Chicken Heart", a comedy track by Bill Cosby from the 1966 album Wonderfulness
 "Chicken Heart", a 1937 episode of the radio show Lights Out
 Chicken Heart, a character from the 1989 film Long Arm of the Law Part 3
 "Chicken Hearts", a 1990 episode of the TV series Roseanne